Chaudhary Shaukat Ali Bhatti is a Pakistani politician who had been a member of the National Assembly of Pakistan from August 2018 till January 2023. Previously, he was the member of the Provincial Assembly of Punjab from 2002 to 2007 and served as the Provincial Minister for Culture and Youth Affairs.

Political career
He was elected to the Provincial Assembly of Punjab from Constituency PP-107 (Hafizabad-III) as a candidate of Pakistan Muslim League (Q) (PML-Q) in 2002 Pakistani general election.

He was elected to the National Assembly of Pakistan from Constituency NA-87 (Hafizabad) as a candidate of Pakistan Tehreek-e-Insaf (PTI) in 2018 Pakistani general election.

References

Living people
1974 births
Pakistani MNAs 2018–2023
Punjab MPAs 2002–2007
Provincial ministers of Punjab
Pakistan Muslim League (Q) MPAs (Punjab)
Pakistan Tehreek-e-Insaf MNAs
People from Hafizabad District